This is a list of hospitals in New Zealand. It includes hospitals certified by the Ministry of Health, such as public hospitals, maternity centres, private surgical centres, psychiatric hospitals and hospices. It does not include facilities which are not certified hospitals, such as accident and emergency centres, general practice clinics, fertility clinics, rest homes and veterinary centres.

References 

New Zealand
 List of Hospitals in New Zealand
Hospitals
Hospitals
New Zealand